Midnight is a lost 1922 American silent drama film directed by Maurice Campbell and written by Harvey F. Thew. The film stars Constance Binney, William Courtleigh, Sidney Bracey, Arthur Stuart Hull, Herbert Fortier, Helen Lynch, and Edward Martindel. The film was released on February 19, 1922, by Paramount Pictures.

Plot
As described in a film magazine, Edna Morris (Binney), daughter of William Morris (Courtleigh), American ambassador to a South American country, is inveigled into a hasty marriage with George Potter (Hull), an attache of the embassy. That same day George is threatened with arrest for embezzlement and escapes by leaping into the bay. He is believed drowned. Edna's father resigns his post and they return to their American home. On an adjoining estate is Senator Dart (Martindel) and his son Jack (Mulhall). Edna falls in love with Jack and their engagement is announced. George returns and attempts to blackmail Edna's father, who then forbids the marriage of Edna and Jack. However, the couple elope and are married right at midnight. Upon their return home, Edna finds George's body in the library. The butler clears up the mystery, stating that he shot the man in the dark, thinking he was a burglar. A bullet from Potter's gun hit the wall clock and it shows that the shooting occurred ten minutes before midnight.

Cast
Constance Binney as Edna Morris
William Courtleigh as William Morris
Sidney Bracey as Dodd
Arthur Stuart Hull as George Potter
Herbert Fortier as Bishop Astor
Helen Lynch as Grace Astor
Edward Martindel as Senator Dart
Jack Mulhall as Jack Dart

References

External links

1922 films
1920s English-language films
Silent American drama films
1922 drama films
Paramount Pictures films
American black-and-white films
American silent feature films
Lost American films
Films directed by Maurice Campbell
1922 lost films
Lost drama films
1920s American films